Eilema heterogyna is a moth of the subfamily Arctiinae. It was described by George Hampson in 1910. It is found in Zambia.

References

Endemic fauna of Zambia
heterogyna
Moths described in 1910
Fauna of Zambia
Moths of Africa